Ryhor Reles (Belarusian: Рыгор Рэлес, Russian: Гирш Релес; April 23, 1913 – September 19, 2004), a Jewish-Belarusian writer, was one of the last writers in Belarus that wrote in Yiddish.
He was born in 1913 in Chashniki, Vitebsk region, studied pedagogy at the Vitebsk pedagogical institute, then studied Yiddish philology in Minsk. His first poem was published in a Soviet Jewish newspaper entitled "Junger Arbeiter" in 1931. He wrote poems and prose in Yiddish and also several poems in Russian. Most of his works were translated and published in Belarusian.

1913 births
2004 deaths
People from Chashniki
People from Lepelsky Uyezd
Belarusian Jews
Yiddish-language writers
Belarusian writers
Soviet writers